is a Japanese whisky distillery.

The distillery is owned by Nikka Whisky Distilling, and was opened in 1934.  It is the older of the two distilleries owned by Nikka Whisky, the other being the company’s Miyagikyo distillery near Sendai.

See also
 List of historic whisky distilleries

References

Notes

Bibliography

External links

Yoichi distillery – Nikka Whisky official site page about the distillery
Yoichi single malt whisky products – Nikka Whisky official site page about the distillery's single malt products

This article is based upon a translation of the French language version as at May 2014.

Buildings and structures in Hokkaido
Distilleries in Japan
Japanese whisky
Companies based in Hokkaido
1934 establishments in Japan
Japanese brands
Yoichi, Hokkaido